Gabriel Solomon Wilson (born October 7, 1974) is an American record producer, Christian musician, multi-instrumentalist. Over the course of his music career, Wilson has produced and written on many projects including John Mark McMillan's Mercury & Lightning (Billboard #1) and Lindy Conant & The Circuit Riders' Every Nation (Billboard #1) Wilson was a member of the Rock n Roll Worship Circus and The Listening, while he has toured with The Violet Burning. He has released two solo studio albums, Lovely Is Death - EP in 2006 and The McGuire Side in 2012.

Personal life 
Gabriel resides in the Portland, Oregon area with his wife, Elisa, and their children. He helped found Rogue Music Alliance, an independent record label, with his friend David Staley, in Vancouver, Washington where he is the active CEO of RMA.

Music History
His music career began in 1999 with the Rock n Roll Worship Circus, while he would eventually become a member of The Listening, and a touring member of The Violet Burning. Wilson is a multi-instrumentalist and music producer, having produced multiple albums for Bethel Music. He was nominated for a GMA Dove Award at the 46th GMA Dove Awards in the Worship Song of the Year category, where he was a writer on the song, "Forever (We Sing Hallelujah)", by Kari Jobe.

Wilson released an extended play, Lovely Is Death, on December 10, 2006, with L-Town Records. He subsequently released a studio album, The McGuire Side, named after his father's side of the family, was independently released, on September 18, 2012.

Discography

References

External links
 

1974 births
American performers of Christian music
Living people
Singers from Washington (state)
Musicians from Portland, Oregon
Songwriters from Oregon
Singers from Oregon
Songwriters from Washington (state)
20th-century American singers
21st-century American singers
20th-century American male singers
21st-century American male singers
American male songwriters